In mathematics, there are up to isomorphism exactly two separably acting hyperfinite type II factors; one infinite and one finite. Murray and von Neumann proved that up to isomorphism there is a unique von Neumann algebra that is a factor of type II1 and also hyperfinite; it is called the hyperfinite type II1 factor.
There are an uncountable number of other factors of type II1. Connes proved that the infinite one is also unique.

Constructions

The von Neumann group algebra of a discrete group with the infinite conjugacy class property is a factor of type II1, and if the group is amenable and countable the factor is hyperfinite. There are many groups with these properties, as any locally finite group is amenable.  For example, the  von Neumann group algebra of the infinite symmetric group of all permutations of a countable infinite set that fix all but a finite number of elements gives the hyperfinite type II1 factor.
The hyperfinite type II1 factor also arises from the group-measure space construction for ergodic free measure-preserving actions of countable amenable groups on probability spaces.
The infinite tensor product of a countable number of factors of type In with respect to their tracial states is the hyperfinite type II1 factor.  When n=2,  this is also sometimes called the Clifford algebra of an infinite separable Hilbert space.
If p is any non-zero finite projection in a hyperfinite von Neumann algebra A of type II, then pAp is the hyperfinite type II1 factor. Equivalently the fundamental group of A is the group of positive real numbers. This can often be hard to see directly.

Properties
The hyperfinite II1 factor R is the unique smallest infinite
dimensional factor in the following sense: it is contained in any other infinite dimensional factor, and any infinite dimensional factor contained in R is isomorphic to R.

The outer automorphism group of R is an infinite simple group with countable many conjugacy classes, indexed by pairs consisting of a positive integer p and a complex pth root of 1.

The projections of the hyperfinite II1 factor form a continuous geometry.

The infinite hyperfinite type II factor
While there are other factors of type II∞, there is a unique hyperfinite one, up to isomorphism.  It consists of those infinite square matrices with entries in the hyperfinite type II1 factor that define bounded operators.

See also

Subfactors

References
A. Connes, Classification of Injective Factors The Annals of Mathematics  2nd Ser., Vol. 104, No. 1 (Jul., 1976), pp. 73–115
F.J. Murray,   J. von Neumann,    On rings of operators IV  Ann. of Math. (2), 44  (1943)  pp. 716–808. This shows that all approximately finite factors of type II1 are isomorphic.

Von Neumann algebras